The River E is a river in the Highlands of Scotland. It begins in the north-west of the Monadh Liath, to the south-east of Loch Ness. It runs in a north-westerly direction for about 10 km, before flowing into Loch Mhòr.

The river has a small hydro-electric scheme. This run-of-the-river scheme has a capacity of 3MW and is operated by RWE Npower. Construction of the scheme began in 2006, and it was commissioned in 2007.

The River E is among the shortest place names in the world.

References 

E